Simon Webster may refer to:
Simon Webster (rugby union)
Simon Webster (footballer)